Melchor may refer to:
 Melchor (name)
 Melchor Island in Chile
Melchor Ocampo, Nuevo León, a municipality in Mexico
Melchor Ocampo, State of Mexico, a town and municipality in Mexico
Villa de Tututepec de Melchor Ocampo, a town and municipality in south-western Mexico
Melchor de Mencos, a municipality in Guatemala
Instituto Español Melchor de Jovellanos, a Spanish international school in Morocco
 , the former American Auk-class minesweeper USS Roselle (AM-379); acquired by the Mexican Navy on 1 February 1973; renamed Manuel Gutiérrez Zamora (P109), 1993; in active service.
 , the former American Auk-class minesweeper USS Scoter (AM-381); acquired by the Mexican Navy on 19 September 1972 as Gutiérrez Zamora (C84); later reclassified as G16; later renamed Melchor Ocampo; renamed Felipe Xicoténcatl (P115), 1993; retired from service by 2004
 Melkor, a fictional character in Tolkien's legendarium.

See also
Melchior (disambiguation)